The Plasmodiidae are a family of apicomplexan parasites, including the type genus Plasmodium, which is responsible for malaria. This family was erected in 1903 by Mesnil and is one of the four families in the order Haemospororida.

Diagnostic criteria 
The diagnostic criteria of the Plasmodiidae are:

 Macrogametes and microgamonts develop independently
 Meiosis is absent
 Microgametocyte produces eight flagellated microgametes
 Zygote is motile (known as an ookinete)
 Conoid present in ookinete stage only
 Sporozoites naked in oocyst (that is without a sporocyst)
 Sporozoites have three walls
 Heteroxenous: merogony and gamogony occur in vertebrate host, and fertilization and sporogony in definitive host (a blood-sucking insect)
 Hemozoin pigment is produced

Taxonomy

The family Plasmodiidae has three sister taxa in the order Haemospororida: the families Garniidae, Haemoproteidae, and Leucocytozoidae.

The Haemoproteidae and the Plasmodiidae both produce pigment, and these have been placed in the suborder Laveraniina.

Neither the Haemoproteidae nor the Leucocytozoidae have an asexual cycle in the peripheral blood.

The Garniidae do not produce pigment, but do have an asexual cycle in the blood. They appear to be the earliest diverging clade in this group.

The Plasmodiidae contain these genera:
 Genus Bioccala Landau et al 1984
 Genus Biguetiella Landau et al 1984
 Genus Billbraya Paperna & Landau 1990
 Genus Dionisia Landau et al 1980
 Genus Hepatocystis Miller 1908
 Genus Mesnilium Misra, Haldar & Chakravarty 1972
 Genus Nycteria Garnham and Heisch 1953
 Genus Plasmodium Marchiafava & Celli 1885
 Subgenus Asiamoeba Telford 1988
 Subgenus Bennettinia Valkiūnas 1997
 Subgenus Carinamoeba Garnham 1966
 Subgenus Giovannolaia Corradetti, Garnham & Laird 1963
 Subgenus Haemamoeba Grassi & Feletti 1890
 Subgenus Huffia Garnham & Laird 1963
 Subgenus Lacertaemoba Telford 1988
 Subgenus Laverania Bray 1963
 Subgenus Novyella Corradetti, Garnham & Laird 1963
 Subgenus Ophidiella Garnham 1966
 Subgenus Paraplasmodium Telford 1988
 Subgenus Plasmodium Bray 1963 emend. Garnham 1964
 Subgenus Sauramoeba Garnham 1966
 Subgenus Vinckeia Garnham 1964
 Genus Polychromophilus Landau et al 1984
 Genus Rayella Dasgupta 1967
 Genus Saurocytozoon Lainson & Shaw 1969
 Genus †Vetufebrus Poinar 2011

The genus Mesnilium is the only taxon that infects fish. The genus has a single species and has been reported only once. This genus may have been mistakenly placed in this genus. DNA studies are likely to be needed to clarify this point.

References 

Apicomplexa families
Haemosporida